Seattle Dancer (April 22, 1984 – June 2, 2007) was an Irish Thoroughbred racehorse who in 1985 became the world's most expensive yearling ever sold at public auction.

Background
Seattle Dancer was bred in Kentucky by Warner L. Jones, William S. Farish III, and William S. Kilroy. The partnership owned his important dam, My Charmer. My Charmer was the dam of 1977 U.S. Triple Crown winner, Seattle Slew. Seattle Dancer's sire was the 1971 British Triple Crown winner and Champion sire, Nijinsky, who was a son of Northern Dancer, whom the National Thoroughbred Racing Association calls "one of the most influential sires in Thoroughbred history". , Seattle Dancer joins nine other descendants of Northern Dancer who clinch the entire list of the ten most expensive colts sold at auction.

In July 1985, Seattle Dancer was sent to the Keenland selected yearling sale where intense bidding on behalf of major breeders such as Allen Paulson and Sheikh Mohammed drove his selling price to a world record US$13.1 million (equal to about $ million today). Seattle Dancer's new owners were Stavros Niarchos (Greece), Susan Magnier and her father, Vincent O'Brien (Ireland), Robert Sangster (England), and a California businessman, Daniel Schwartz.

Racing career
The colt was sent to Ballydoyle in Ireland, but a virus swept through the stables that kept a weakened Seattle Dancer out of racing as a two-year-old. Conditioned by Vincent O'Brien, and raced in the colors of Stavros Niarchos, in his April 1987 debut Seattle Dancer finished third in a race at the Curragh Racecourse in Ireland. He then won the Group 3 Gallinule Stakes at the Curragh and the Group 2 Derrinstown Stud Derby Trial at Leopardstown Racecourse. In his next start, at Longchamp Racecourse in Paris, France, he finished sixth in the Group 1 Prix du Jockey Club. At the same racecourse, in what would prove to be his final race, Seattle Dancer ran second in the Group 1 Grand Prix de Paris.

Stud record
Seattle Dancer entered stud in 1988. He first stood at Coolmore's Ashford Stud in Kentucky then at their facility in Ireland. In 1997, he was sent to stand at East Stud in Japan and for his last five years, served stallion duty in Germany. During his career, Seattle Dancer sired 37 stakes race winners including:
 Seattle Rhyme - won the 1991 Racing Post Trophy
 Pike Place Dancer - winner of the 1996 Kentucky Oaks
 Que Belle - Champion filly in Germany, won 1997 Classics Preis der Diana (German Oaks) and the Henkel-Rennen
 Caffe Latte - won California's 2000 Santa Barbara and Ramona Handicaps

See also
Thoroughbred valuation

References

 Seattle Dancer's pedigree and partial racing stats
 July 13, 2007  Thoroughbred Times article titled Record yearling Seattle Dancer dies at 23

1984 racehorse births
2007 racehorse deaths
Racehorses bred in Kentucky
Racehorses trained in Ireland
Thoroughbred family 13-c